Newark is a city in Independence County, Arkansas, United States. The population was 1,180 at the 2020 census.

The local high school has won three basketball state championships, two quiz bowl state titles, and one softball state championship.
The first Cedar Ridge Basketball State Championship came against East Poinsett County, which at the time had Malik Monk, who went on to become a shooting guard for Kentucky.

Geography
Newark is located in east central Independence County approximately three miles north of the White River, and near the mouth of the Black River.

List of highways 
  Arkansas Highway 69
  Arkansas Highway 69 Business
  Arkansas Highway 122

Demographics

2020 census

As of the 2020 United States census, there were 1,180 people, 469 households, and 302 families residing in the city.

2000 census
As of the census of 2000, there were 1,219 people, 500 households, and 345 families residing in the city. The racial makeup of the city was 96.55% White, 0.66% Black or African American, 0.98% Native American, 0.49% Asian, 0.08% Pacific Islander, 0.08% from other races, and 1.15% from two or more races.  0.90% of the population were Hispanic or Latino of any race.

There were 500 households, out of which 35.8% had children under the age of 18 living with them, 55.0% were married couples living together, 10.6% had a female householder with no husband present, and 31.0% were non-families. 29.0% of all households were made up of individuals, and 18.0% had someone living alone who was 65 years of age or older.  The average household size was 2.44 and the average family size was 3.01.

In the city, the population was spread out, with 26.7% under the age of 18, 8.8% from 18 to 24, 27.6% from 25 to 44, 21.5% from 45 to 64, and 15.4% who were 65 years of age or older.  The median age was 36 years. For every 100 females, there were 87.0 males.  For every 100 females age 18 and over, there were 83.6 males.

The median income for a household in the city was $28,239, and the median income for a family was $34,545. Males had a median income of $27,404 versus $17,692 for females. The per capita income for the city was $14,392.  About 9.1% of families and 14.2% of the population were below the poverty line, including 18.5% of those under age 18 and 20.1% of those age 65 or over.

Education
Students in Newark are served by Cedar Ridge School District. It was formed on July 1, 2004 from the consolidation of the Newark School District and the Cord Charlotte School District.

See also

 List of cities in Arkansas

References

External links

Cities in Independence County, Arkansas
Cities in Arkansas